The 2005 East–West Shrine Game was the 80th staging of the all-star college football exhibition game featuring NCAA Division I Football Bowl Subdivision players. The game featured over 80 players from the 2004 college football season, and prospects for the 2005 Draft of the professional National Football League (NFL). In the week prior to the game, scouts from all 32 NFL teams attended. The proceeds from the East–West Shrine Game benefit Shriners Hospitals for Children.

The game was played on January 15, 2005, at 11 a.m. PT at SBC Park in San Francisco, and was televised by ESPN. This was the last Shrine Game played in California.

The offensive MVP was Stefan LeFors (QB, Louisville), while the defensive MVP was Alex Green (S, Duke). The inaugural Pat Tillman Award was presented to Morgan Scalley (S, Utah); the award "is presented to a player who best exemplifies character, intelligence, sportsmanship and service".

Scoring summary 

Sources:

Statistics 

Source:

Coaching staff 
East head coach: Joe Tiller (Tiller was a player in the 1963 game)

East assistants: Jim Chaney & Brock Spack

West head coach: Mike Riley

West assistants: Mark Banker & Paul Chryst

Source:

Rosters 
Source:

2005 NFL Draft

References 

East-West Shrine Game
East–West Shrine Bowl
American football in San Francisco
January 2005 sports events in the United States
East-West Shrine Game
2005 in San Francisco